Eleutherococcus brachypus (Chinese: 短柄五加 duan bing wu jia) is a species of flowering plant in the family Araliaceae. It is endemic to China, where it occurs in scrub fields and roadsides on mountain slopes in Gansu, Ningxia, and Shaanxi provinces.

This plant contains acetylated stilbenoid glucosides.

References 

Plants described in 1927
brachypus
Endemic flora of China